Marja-Helena Pälvilä (born 4 March 1970) is a Finnish retired ice hockey player.  She was a member of the Finnish women's national ice hockey team throughout the 1990s and 2000s and won a bronze medal at the inaugural Olympic women's ice hockey tournament at the 1998 Winter Olympics. Pälvilä also represented Finland in the women’s ice hockey tournaments at the 2002 and 2006 Winter Olympics, and won bronze medals at the IIHF Women's World Championships in 1997 and 2000, and at the 1996 IIHF European Women Championships.

References

External links

1970 births
Living people
Finnish women's ice hockey defencemen
Ice hockey players at the 1998 Winter Olympics
Ice hockey players at the 2002 Winter Olympics
Ice hockey players at the 2006 Winter Olympics
Medalists at the 1998 Winter Olympics
Olympic bronze medalists for Finland
Olympic ice hockey players of Finland
Olympic medalists in ice hockey
Sportspeople from Oulu
Oulun Kärpät Naiset players
Espoo Blues Naiset players
Keravan Shakers players